The 1970 United Kingdom general election was held on Thursday 18 June 1970. It resulted in a surprise victory for the Conservative Party under leader Edward Heath, which defeated the governing Labour Party under Prime Minister Harold Wilson. The Liberal Party, under its new leader Jeremy Thorpe, lost half its seats. The Conservatives, including the Ulster Unionist Party (UUP), secured a majority of 30 seats. This general election was the first in which people could vote from the age of 18, after passage of the Representation of the People Act the previous year, and the first UK election where party, and not just candidate names were allowed to be put on the ballots.

Most opinion polls prior to the election indicated a comfortable Labour victory, and put Labour up to 12.4% ahead of the Conservatives. On election day, however, a late swing gave the Conservatives a 3.4% lead and ended almost six years of Labour government, although Wilson remained leader of the Labour Party in opposition. Writing in the aftermath of the election, the political scientist Richard Rose described the Conservative victory as "surprising" and noted a significant shift in votes between the two main parties. The Times journalist George Clark wrote that the election would be "remembered as the occasion when the people of the United Kingdom hurled the findings of the opinion polls back into the faces of the pollsters".

The result would provide the mandate for Heath as Prime Minister to begin formal negotiations for the United Kingdom to become a member state of the European Communities (EC)—or the "Common Market" as it was more widely known at the time, before it later became the European Union; the UK officially joined the EC on 1 January 1973, along with the Republic of Ireland and Denmark.

Frontbench Labour politicians George Brown and Jennie Lee were voted out at this election.

This marked the end of a series of elections where both main parties won over 40% of the vote.  This would not occur again for the Conservatives for nine years; Labour would wait 27.  This was also the most recent election at which a House of Commons majority for one party immediately before election day was replaced by a Commons majority for a different party on election day.

The result was cast as a two-party politics outcome, with no third party reaching 10% of the (total) vote. Such an outcome would not happen again until the 2017 election.

The election was the last in which a nationwide UK party gained seats in Northern Ireland. The UUP sat with the Conservative Party at Westminster, traditionally taking the Conservative parliamentary whip. To all intents and purposes the UUP functioned as the Northern Ireland branch of the Conservative Party. However, hardline unionist Ian Paisley unseated the UUP incumbent in North Antrim, a clear sign that the UUP's complete dominance over unionist politics in Northern Ireland was already starting to weaken. In 1972, in protest over the permanent prorogation of the Parliament of Northern Ireland,  Westminster UUP MPs withdrew from the alliance.

Election date
The date of 18 June was supposedly chosen because Harold Wilson wanted as Prime Minister to go to the polls before the introduction of decimal coinage in early 1971, for which his government had been responsible and which he thought was hugely unpopular, and because Wilson sought to gain some momentum by surprising the Conservatives, who were expecting an October election.

Overview
Commentators believed that an unexpectedly bad set of balance of payments figures (a £31-million trade deficit) published three days before the election and a loss of national prestige after the England football team's defeat by West Germany on 14 June in the World Cup contributed to the Labour defeat.

Other factors that were cited as reasons for the Conservative victory included union indiscipline, rising prices, the risk of devaluation, the imposition of Selective Employment Tax (SET), and a set of jobless figures released on final week of the campaign showing unemployment at its highest level since 1940. Interviewed by Robin Day, the outgoing Prime Minister Harold Wilson highlighted the possibility that "complacency engendered by the opinion polls" may have resulted in a poor turnout of Labour supporters.

As defending world champions, England's venture in the World Cup attracted a much keener public interest than the general election did. However an analysis by pollster Matt Singh for the 50th anniversary of the election concluded that the late swing had been caused by the weak economic data and that there was "no evidence" that the World Cup had influenced the outcome.

American pollster Douglas Schoen and Oxford University academic R. W. Johnson asserted that Enoch Powell had attracted 2.5 million votes to the Conservatives, although the Conservative vote only increased by 1.7 million. Johnson later stated "It became clear that Powell had won the 1970 election for the Tories ... of all those who had switched their vote from one party to another, 50 per cent were working class Powellites". The Professor of Political Science Randall Hansen assessed a range of studies, including some which contended that Powell had made little or no difference to the result, but concluded that "At the very least, Powell's effect was likely to have fired up the Conservative vote in constituencies which would have voted Tory in any event". Election night commentators Michael Barratt and Jeffrey Preece dismissed any special "Powell factor", as did Conservative MPs Reginald Maudling, Timothy Raison and Hugh Dykes.

The 1970–74 Parliament has to date been the only time since the 1924–29 Parliament in which the Conservative Party were only in government for one term before returning to opposition.

The most notable casualty of the election was George Brown, deputy leader of the Labour Party, who lost to the Conservative candidate in the Belper constituency. Brown had held the seat since 1945. Labour Minister for the Arts, Jennie Lee lost her Cannock seat, held by Labour since 1935  on a swing of 10.7% to the Conservatives in what Richard Rose called "the biggest upset" of the election.

Unusually for the Liberal Party, the by-elections between 1966 and 1970 had proved almost fruitless, with many Liberal candidates losing deposits. The one exception was its by-election gain of Birmingham Ladywood in June 1969; this was promptly lost in the 1970 general election. The party found itself struggling to introduce its new leader Jeremy Thorpe to the public, owing to the extensive coverage and attention paid to Enoch Powell. The election result was poor for the Liberals, with Thorpe only narrowly winning his own seat in North Devon. Indeed, of the six MPs returned, three (Thorpe, David Steel and John Pardoe) were elected by a majority of less than 1,000 votes.

The BBC's election coverage was led by Cliff Michelmore, along with Robin Day, David Butler and Robert McKenzie. There were periodic cutaways to the BBC regions. This coverage has been rerun on BBC Parliament on several occasions, including on 18 July 2005 as a tribute to Edward Heath after his death the previous day. Its most recent screening was on the 20th of June 2020, to commemorate the 50th anniversary of its first transmission. The BBC coverage was parodied by Monty Python's Flying Circus in its famous "Election Night Special" sketch.

Both BBC and ITN carried their 1970 election night broadcasts in colour, although segments broadcast from some remote locations and some BBC and ITN regional bureaus were transmitted in black-and-white. Some ITV regions were not yet broadcasting in colour at the time of the 1970 elections.

Timeline
The Prime Minister, Harold Wilson, visited Buckingham Palace on 18 May and asked the Queen to dissolve Parliament on 29 May, announcing that the election would be held on 18 June. The key dates were as follows:

Opinion poll summary
Summary of the final polling results before the general election.

Results

This was the first general election where 18-year-olds had the right to vote. Therefore, despite 1.1 million more people voting in 1970 compared to 1966, turnout actually fell by 3%. This 72% turnout was the lowest since the 1935 general election and compared with a post-War high of 84% in 1950. Professor Richard Rose described the low turnout, which he noted was "one of the lowest since the introduction of the democratic franchise", as surprising to politician and pollsters. Changes to electoral law as part of the Representation of the People Act 1969 had made postal voting easier and polling stations were open an hour later than in past elections, and this would have been expected to improve turnout. On top of this it was reported by Rose that an estimated 25% of 18- to 21-year-olds who were now eligible to vote had not put their names on the electoral register, meaning the turnout was even lower than the percentage figure suggested. Rose also argued that the turnout figures in Britain were "now among the lowest in the Western world." Because the previous election had been in 1966, some people had not had their chance to vote in a general election until the age of 25. Labour's number of votes, 12.2 million, was ironically the same amount they had needed to win in 1964. The Conservative vote surge cost Labour in many marginal seats. Rose suggested the absolute fall in the number of Labour votes suggested that many of the party's supporters had decided to abstain. He also noted that the Labour Party's local organisation was poorer than that of the Conservatives, but did not feel this was a significant factor in Labour supporters failing to come out to vote for the Party given that this organisational difference had been the case in past elections without having this effect. For the Liberals, a small 1% drop in their vote share saw them lose 6 seats, 3 of which were held by the narrowest of margins.

In the end the Conservatives achieved a swing of 4.7%, enough to give them a comfortable working majority. As for the smaller parties, they increased their number in the Commons from 2 to 6 seats.

The Scottish National Party won its first-ever seat at a general election (they had won several by-elections previously, going back as far as 1945).

|-
|+ style="caption-side: bottom; font-weight:normal" |All parties shown.
|}

Votes summary

Seats summary

Televised declarations 
These declarations were covered live by the BBC where the returning officer was heard to say "duly elected".

Incumbents defeated

Labour

Donald Dewar (Aberdeen South)
Edwin Brooks (Bebington)
Brian Parkyn (Bedford)
Gwilym Roberts (South Bedfordshire)
George Brown (Belper), Deputy Leader of the Labour Party
Eric Moonman (Billericay)
Christopher Price (Birmingham Perry Barr) 
Ioan Evans (Birmingham Yardley), Comptroller of the Household
Robert Howarth (Bolton East)
Gordon Oakes (Bolton West)
Woodrow Wyatt (Bosworth)
Norman Haseldine (Bradford West)
Colin Jackson (Brighouse and Spenborough)
Dennis Hobden (Brighton Kemptown)
Raymond Dobson (Bristol North East), Assistant Whip
John Ellis (Bristol North West)
Robert Maxwell (Buckingham)
Jennie Lee (Cannock), Minister for the Arts
Ted Rowlands (Cardiff North)
Alistair Macdonald (Chislehurst)
Ednyfed Hudson Davies (Conway)
David Winnick (Croydon South)
Sydney Irving (Dartford), Chairman of Ways and Means
David Ennals (Dover), Minister of State for Social Services
Stan Newens (Epping)
Gwyneth Dunwoody (Exeter), Parliamentary Secretary at the Board of Trade
John Dunwoody (Falmouth and Camborne)
Terence Boston (Faversham)
John Diamond (Gloucester), Chief Secretary to the Treasury
Albert Murray (Gravesend), Parliamentary Secretary to the Ministry of Transport
Benjamin Whitaker (Hampstead), Parliamentary Secretary to the Minister of Overseas Development
Roy Roebuck (Harrow East)
Peter Jackson (High Peak)
Alan Lee Williams (Hornchurch)
Arnold Shaw (Ilford South)
Sir Dingle Foot (Ipswich), Solicitor General for England and Wales
John Binns (Keighley)
John Page (Kings Lynn)
Stanley Henig (Lancaster)
Harold Davies (Leek), Parliamentary Private Secretary to the Prime Minister
James Dickens (Lewisham West)
William Howie (Luton), Comptroller of the Household
Jeremy Bray (Middlesbrough West)
Dennis Coe (Middleton and Prestwich)
Donald Anderson, Baron Anderson of Swansea (Monmouth)
Bert Hazell (Norfolk North)
George Perry (Nottingham South)
John Horner (Oldbury and Halesowen)
Evan Luard (Oxford)
Ronald Atkins (Preston North)
Peter Mahon (Preston South)
John Lee (Reading)
Anne Kerr (Rochester and Chatham)
Antony Gardner (Rushcliffe)
Frank Hooley (Sheffield Heeley)
Bob Mitchell (Southampton Test)
Arnold Gregory (Stockport North)
Ernest Davies (Stretford)
Gerald Fowler (The Wrekin)
John Ryan (Uxbridge)
Malcolm Macmillan (Western Isles)
Hugh Gray (Yarmouth)

Conservative

Kenneth Baker (Acton), by-election win
Donald Williams (Dudley), by-election win
Esmond Wright (Glasgow Pollok), by-election win
Bruce Campbell (Oldham West), by-election win
Christopher Ward (Swindon), by-election win
Fred Silvester (Walthamstow West), by-election win

Liberal

Wallace Lawler (Birmingham Ladywood), by-election win
Michael Winstanley (Cheadle)
Richard Wainwright (Colne Valley)
Eric Lubbock (Orpington), Liberal Chief Whip
Alasdair Mackenzie (Ross and Cromarty)

Ulster Unionist Party

Henry Clark (Antrim North)
James Hamilton, Marquess of Hamilton (Fermanagh and South Tyrone)

Scottish National Party

Winnie Ewing (Hamilton), by-election win

Plaid Cymru

Gwynfor Evans (Carmarthen), by-election win

Democratic Party

Desmond Donnelly (Pembrokeshire), former Labour MP

See also
List of MPs elected in the 1970 United Kingdom general election
1970 United Kingdom general election in Northern Ireland
1970 United Kingdom local elections

Notes

References

Further reading

External links

United Kingdom election results—summary results 1885–1979

Manifestos
A Better Tomorrow, 1970 Conservative Party manifesto
Now Britain's stronglet's make it great to live in, 1970 Labour Party manifesto
What a Life!, 1970 Liberal Party manifesto

 
1970
General election
General election
Harold Wilson
Edward Heath